Megan Suri is an American actress, known for her role in The MisEducation of Bindu (2019), as well as for playing Aneesa in the Netflix teen comedy series Never Have I Ever (2020).

Career 
Suri debuted in the lead role with the award-winning The MisEducation of Bindu (2019). A critic noted that "Megan Suri is perfectly cast as Bindu". She was later cast as Aneesa, another Indian student who goes to Devi's high school, in the second season of Never Have I Ever. One critic opined that "Megan Suri is outstanding as Aneesa".

Filmography

Film

Television

References

External links 
 

1999 births
Living people
People from Downey, California
American film actresses
American television actresses
American actresses of Indian descent
21st-century American actresses
Actresses from California